Drawdown cards are used for testing paints and coatings through wet film preparation.

Black and white cards are used to measure both opacity and contrast ratio. By measuring reflectance values of both parts of the card one can gain a quantitative opacity value of a paint sample.

See also
 
 
 

Painting materials
Measuring instruments